Musgrave Brisco (1791 – 9 May 1854) was a British Conservative Party politician.

A former mayor of Hastings.
In the 1830s, he assisted his brother, Wastel Brisco, with the development of Bohemia House in Summerfields, St Leonards-on-Sea, and was appointed High Sheriff of Sussex for 1843. He was then elected as a Member of Parliament (MP) for Hastings at a by-election in 1844, and held the seat until he resigned from Parliament through appointment as Steward of the Chiltern Hundreds on 5 May 1854.

References

External links
 

1791 births
1854 deaths
Conservative Party (UK) MPs for English constituencies
High Sheriffs of Sussex
UK MPs 1841–1847
UK MPs 1847–1852
UK MPs 1852–1857